William Austin Ingram (July 6, 1924 – May 26, 2002) was a United States district judge of the United States District Court for the Northern District of California.

Education and career

Born in Jeffersonville, Indiana, Ingram served in the United States Marine Corps Reserve during World War II, from 1943 to 1946. He received a Bachelor of Laws from the University of Louisville School of Law in 1950, and was in private practice in San Francisco, California from 1951 to 1955, and in San Jose, California from 1955 to 1969. He was a deputy district attorney of Santa Clara County, California from 1955 to 1957. He served as a judge of the Municipal Court for the Mountain View Judicial District in Palo Alto, California from 1969 to 1971. In 1971, Ingram was appointed to the Superior Court bench in Santa Clara County by California Governor Ronald Reagan. He served there until 1976.

Federal judicial service

On June 2, 1976, Ingram was nominated by President Gerald Ford to a seat on the United States District Court for the Northern District of California vacated by Judge Alfonso Zirpoli. Ingram was confirmed by the United States Senate on July 23, 1976, and received his commission the same day. He served as Chief Judge from 1988 to 1990, assuming senior status on November 15, 1990. Ingram served in that capacity until his death on May 26, 2002, in Menlo Park, California.

References

Sources
 
 The Honorable William Ingram

1924 births
2002 deaths
California state court judges
Judges of the United States District Court for the Northern District of California
United States district court judges appointed by Gerald Ford
20th-century American judges
People from Menlo Park, California
United States Marines
University of Louisville School of Law alumni
Superior court judges in the United States